The 2021 Gran Piemonte was the 105th edition of the Gran Piemonte road cycling one day race. It was held in the titular region of northwestern Italy on 7 October 2021 as part of the 2021 UCI Europe Tour and the 2021 UCI ProSeries calendars.

After the previous two editions featured hilly routes, the race was expected to favour the sprinters for the first time since 2018. The  race along the southern edge of the Italian Alps started in Rocca Canavese and headed northeast. The final  featured two long false flat sections. After a short descent, riders then took on the second false flat section, which led to the finish in Borgosesia.

Matthew Walls held off Giacomo Nizzolo with a bike throw on line to win the race, while Olav Kooij, who had crashed just inside the final , rebounded to finish third.

Teams 
13 of the 19 UCI WorldTeams and eight UCI ProTeams made up the 21 teams that participated in the race. A total of 140 riders started the race, of which 136 finished.

UCI WorldTeams

 
 
 
 
 
 
 
 
 
 
 
 
 

UCI ProTeams

Result

References

External links 
  

2021
Gran Piemonte
Gran Piemonte
Gran Piemonte
Gran Piemonte
Rocca Canavese